North Carolina Highway 772 (NC 772) is a primary state highway in the U.S. state of North Carolina. NC 772 is a two-lane rural highway that traverses  from  U.S. Route 311 (US 311) north of Pine Hall to NC 704 in Prestonville.

Route description
The highway starts at the intersection of US 311 and Pine Hall Road and then continues north from the intersection. At Madison Road, NC 772 bears left but shortly begins the curve toward the northeast. The road makes another westerly turn at K-Fork Road but again turns back toward the north before reaching NC 704. NC 772 ends at NC 704 south of Sandy Ridge. The road is a rural two lane road throughout the entire length of the highway.

History
In 1978, NC 772 was truncated to its current southern terminus with US 311, leaving its spur into Pine Hall a secondary road.

Junction list

References

External links

 

Transportation in Stokes County, North Carolina
772